2014–15 Pirveli Liga was the 26th season of the Georgian Pirveli Liga. The season began on 25 August 2014 and finished on 23 May 2015.

Participating teams

Group A

Group B

League tables

Group A

Group B

Promotion play-offs

See also 
 2014–15 Umaglesi Liga
 2014–15 Georgian Cup

External links
 Results, fixtures, tables at Soccerway

Erovnuli Liga 2 seasons
2014–15 in Georgian football
Georgia